Wesley Goodman (born February 14, 1984) is an American Republican politician who served as the Ohio State Representative for the 87th District from 2016 until his resignation in 2017. His former district consists of Crawford, Morrow and Wyandot counties, as well as portions of Marion and Seneca counties.

On November 14, 2017, Goodman resigned his seat following alleged "inappropriate behavior" in his state office, later revealed as extramarital sexual activity with a man.

Early life
Goodman was born into a family of farmers and first responders, and is a native of Cardington, Ohio. He graduated in 2006 from Ohio Wesleyan University, where he majored in politics and government.

Political career
Goodman worked briefly for former U.S. senator and Ohio attorney general Mike DeWine before joining the staff of U.S. representative Jim Jordan (R-OH). By 2013, Goodman was serving as the managing director of the Conservative Action Project.

In June 2015, Goodman announced his candidacy for the District 87 seat in the Ohio House of Representatives. Jeffrey McClain, the District 87 representative at the time, could not run again in 2016 due to term limits. In the March 2016 Republican primary, Goodman defeated former state representative Steve Reinhard with 41% of the vote; Reinhard had represented the same seat from 2001 to 2008. Goodman ran unopposed in the 2016 general election. His term began on January 4, 2017.

In October 2015, an 18-year-old man accused Goodman of sexually assaulting him. This was reported to Tony Perkins, head of the Family Research Council, who confronted Goodman about the allegation and referred to other "similar incidents." Perkins withdrew his political support, but Goodman did not withdraw his candidacy for the Ohio legislature and was elected in 2016. These incidents were apparently never reported to the police and did not become public knowledge until after Goodman's resignation.

Marriage, sex scandal, and resignation
Goodman described himself as a supporter of "traditional marriage," having told constituents that the "ideals of a loving father and mother, a committed natural marriage, and a caring community are well worth pursuing and protecting." In 2012 he married Bethany Peck, an assistant director of the March for Life and a former staffer for U.S. representative Bob Latta; they had no children and subsequently divorced. Goodman resigned his office November 14, 2017, after a non-staffer witnessed him and an unnamed adult male having consensual sexual relations in Goodman's office. The Speaker of the Ohio House, a Republican, Cliff Rosenberger, described the incident as "inappropriate behavior related to his state office."

Current status 

As of 2021, according to his LinkedIn profile, he is a store manager at Brooks Brothers at Polaris Fashion Place in Columbus, Ohio.

References

External links

1984 births
Living people
Republican Party members of the Ohio House of Representatives
Ohio Wesleyan University alumni
21st-century American politicians
People from Cardington, Ohio